Melissa "Mel" Bampton is an Australian radio announcer, best known for her work on the Triple J network.
She began at the station in 2000 as producer of the Drive show - with Costa Zouliou, Myf Warhurst, Nicole Fossati and Charlie Pickering at various times. In mid-2002, Fossati left the station, and Bampton took her place as co-host.

Career
In 2004 the station's programming underwent major changes, and Bampton started hosting her own music show Mel in the Mornings. The show replaced the previous Morning Show, which was heavily current affairs and talkback, with a more music oriented show, including interviews and live performances. Mel was the creator of the Like a Version segment of bands playing cover songs, which has spawned nine CDs  and continues on the triple j breakfast program to this day.

On 26 January 2007, Mel finished her role as a triple j presenter. In late 2007 Mel presented and produced the 2nd Producer Series for triple j, which featured: Steve Albini (Nirvana, PJ Harvey, Joanna Newsom), Michael Beinhorn (Hole, Marlilyn Manson, The Bronx), Trina Shoemaker (Queens Of The Stoneage, Something For Kate), Jim Abbiss (Arctic Monkeys, Kasabian), Tony Cohen (Nick Cave,  Beasts of Bourbon), Squeak E Clean (Yeah Yeah Yeahs, Ben Lee), Ewan Pearson (The Rapture), Dave Catching (Rancho De La Luna - The Desert Sessions) Tim Whitten (Architecture In Helsinki, The Panics) and John Agnello (Dinosaur Jr, Sonic Youth, The Living End).

In 2008, Bampton produced and presented The Album Series for triple j which took a look at four outstanding Australian Albums, by artists: Sarah Blasko, The Living End, Hoodoo Gurus and Regurgitator. The Album Series featured on triple j in late 2008.

Bampton produced and presented the third season of The Producer Series, which aired on Triple J in 2009. The third series featured Alan Moulder (Nine Inch Nails, The Killers, Wolfmother), Scott Horscroft (The Panics, Sleepy Jackson), Dave Fridmann (Flaming Lips, Mercury Rev, Sleater Kinney), Harry Vanda (AC/DC, British India, The Angels), Philippe Zdar (Cassius, Phoenix, Cut Copy) and Diplo (MIA, Santigold, Major Lazer).  A print version of The Producer Series is set for release through Harper Collins in 2015.

Bampton was the Music & Books Editor for 'alternative mainstream' women's magazine yen between 2008 and 2012, and is also the Director of a Byron Bay-based media company that works with Soundwave Festival, and musical artists Ash Grunwald and Dune Rats.

Personal life
Bampton is married, and has three children - Jazzy, Tiger and Obi - the youngest being born in 2012.

Bampton is also a full-time Yoga Therapist and teacher, studying and instructing under her married name 'Lissie Turner' at The Yoga Shack. She was trained by Dr Natesan Chanderasekaran MD and Lance Schuler. Bampton has been practicing yoga since 1995.

References

External links
 The Producer Series 2009
 The Album Series 2008
 Mel in the Morning at the Triple J site
 The Producer Series 2007
 The Producer Series 2005
 Tom and Alex at the Triple J site

Australian women radio presenters
Living people
Triple J announcers
Year of birth missing (living people)